Lisa Ashton (born 27 August 1970) is an English professional darts player who currently plays in World Darts Federation (WDF) and Professional Darts Corporation (PDC) events. She is a four-time BDO World Darts Women's Champion and has won over 100 titles in women's darts. In 2020, she became the first woman to win a PDC Tour Card at the PDC Q-School.

Career
Ashton reached the quarter-finals of the 2007 Women's World Masters, beating 1996 finalist Heike Jenkins (Ernst) in the last 16 before losing to Rilana Erades. The next year, she reached the semi-finals, beating Anne Kirk in the last 16 and then beat Australia's Cathy Shaw, before losing to eventual winner Francis Hoenselaar.

Ashton then won the 2008 Women's Zuiderduin Masters, beating Trina Gulliver in the final. Ashton qualified for the 2009 Women's World Championship and made her debut at the event. She met Gulliver once more in the quarter-finals but was beaten 2–0. In 2010, Ashton got as far as the semi-finals of the Winmau World Masters, where she lost to Francis Hoenselaar 4–2. In 2011, Ashton defeated Trina Gulliver 4–1 to win the Winmau World Masters. Ashton reached the final of the 2013 BDO World Darts Championship after defeating both Deta Hedman and Sharon Prins 2–0, before she eventually lost to Anastasia Dobromyslova 2–1.

Ashton hit ten 180s on her way to winning the 2014 BDO World Darts Championship at the Lakeside Country Club, which had 16 women qualifiers for the first time in its history. She defeated Aileen de Graaf in the first round, which went to a sudden death deciding leg. She then defeated Tamara Schuur in the Quarter Finals. She then beat Anastasia Dobromyslova, in the semi-final, surviving 6 match darts, before eventually going on to beat Deta Hedman in the final, 3–2. She successfully defended her title in 2015 with a 3–1 win over Fallon Sherrock. Ashton then won the BDO World Trophy, by defeating Anastasia Dobromyslova in the final. At the Winmau World Masters, she lost in the final to Aileen de Graaf after missing six match darts. 

At the 2016 BDO World Darts Championship, Ashton was beaten 2–1 by Trina Gulliver in the quarter-finals. At the 2016 BDO World Trophy, she hit a record three-dart average for a televised women's match of 98.85. In the 2017 BDO World Darts Championship, both Ashton and Corrine Hammond reached the final without losing a set. Ashton won the final 3–0. Ashton won the 2018 BDO World Darts Championship after she beat Dobromyslova 3–1 in the final. This was her fourth World Championship title in five years. Ashton entered the 2019 PDC Qualifying School. She missed out on getting a tour card by one point.

After losing out in the final of the 2020 BDO World Darts Championship to defending champion Mikuru Suzuki, Ashton became the first woman to win a PDC Tour card through Q School, by finishing in twelfth place on the UK Q School Order of Merit. On 5 March 2021, she became the first female to win a match at the UK Open since 2005, defeating Aaron Beeney 6–2 in Round 2 of the 2021 UK Open, and, also setting a new world record, for the highest average of 100.3, on TV, by a female player in her victory over Beeney.

In the 2022 PDC World Darts Championship she lost 3–0 to Ron Meulenkamp in the first round and also lost her PDC tour card. She didn't win it back at Q School. In February, she played in the 2022 World Seniors Darts Championship and got a bye into second round, where she lost 1–3 by sets to Terry Jenkins. Ashton qualified for the 2022 Women's World Matchplay by being in the top 8 in the PDC Women's Series after 12 events. She beat Chloe O'Brien 4–0 in the Quarter-finals but lost 5–4 to Aileen de Graaf in the semi-finals.

Ashton played again at the PDC World Championship of 2023. She was defeated in the first round by Ryan Meikle and had to leave the tournament.

World Championship results

BDO/WDF
 2009: Quarter-final (lost to Trina Gulliver 0–2)
 2012: Quarter-final (lost to Trina Gulliver 0–2)
 2013: Runner-up (lost to Anastasia Dobromyslova 1–2)
 2014: Winner (beat Deta Hedman 3–2)
 2015: Winner (beat Fallon Sherrock 3–1)
 2016: Quarter-final (lost to Trina Gulliver 1–2)
 2017: Winner (beat Corrine Hammond 3–0)
 2018: Winner (beat Anastasia Dobromyslova 3–1)
 2019: First round (lost to Mikuru Suzuki 0–2)
 2020: Runner-up (lost to Mikuru Suzuki 0–3)
 2023:

PDC
 2019: First round (lost to Jan Dekker 1–3)
 2021: First round (lost to Adam Hunt 2–3)
 2022: First round (lost to Ron Meulenkamp 0–3)
 2023: First round (lost to Ryan Meikle 2–3)

WSDT
 2022: Second round (lost to Terry Jenkins 1–3)
 2023: First round (lost to Neil Duff 2–3)

Performance timeline

Career finals

BDO major finals: 1 (4 titles, 2 runners-up)

References

External links

English darts players
Living people
1970 births
Sportspeople from Bolton
BDO women's world darts champions
Professional Darts Corporation former tour card holders
Professional Darts Corporation women's players